Chemistry is the first collaborative studio album by American rapper Buckshot and record producer 9th Wonder. It was released on June 21, 2005 through Duck Down Music as a part of the label's "Triple Threat Campaign", preceded by Sean Price's Monkey Barz and followed by Tek & Steele's Smif 'n' Wessun: Reloaded. Recording sessions took place at Missie Ann Studios in Raleigh, North Carolina. Production was handled entirely by 9th Wonder, with Buckshot and Drew "Dru-Ha" Friedman serving as executive producers. It features guest appearances from Keisha Shontelle, Big Pooh, Joe Scudda, L.E.G.A.C.Y., Phonte, Sean Price and Starang Wondah. This album is paralleled by the Black Moon album Alter the Chemistry, which was basically a remix album produced by Da Beatminerz.

The album peaked at number 69 on the US Billboard Top R&B/Hip-Hop Albums, 34 on the Independent Albums and 25 on the Heatseekers Album.

Critical reception

Chemistry was met with generally favorable reviews from critics. At Album of the Year, which assigns a normalized rating out of 100 to reviews from mainstream publications, the album received an average score of 77 based on four reviews.

Track listing
All Tracks Produced by 9th Wonder

Notes
Both "Intro (Chemistry)" and "Chemistry 101" contains samples from "I Just Want to Be the One in Your Life" by Eddie Kendricks

Personnel
 Kenyatta "Buckshot" Blake – main artist, vocals (tracks: 2-14), executive producer
 Patrick "9th Wonder" Douthit – main artist, producer, mixing, recording (tracks: 1-8, 10-14)
 Keisha Shontelle – featured artist, vocals (tracks: 10, 13)
 Phonte Coleman – featured artist, vocals (track 10)
 Sean Price – featured artist, vocals (track 11)
 Thomas "Rapper Big Pooh" Jones – featured artist, vocals (track 11)
 Joseph "Joe Scudda" Griffen – featured artist, vocals (track 12)
 Kehinde "L.E.G.A.C.Y." Harper – featured artist, vocals (track 12)
 Jack "Starang Wondah" McNair – featured artist, vocals (track 14)
 Christopher "Khrysis" Tyson – recording (track 9)
 Christopher "Cesar Comanche" Robinson – engineering
 Drew "Dru-Ha" Friedman – executive producer
 Eckō Mindlabs – art direction
 Akash Khokha – additional art direction
 Romeo Tanghal – cover art, illustration
 Raphael Tanghal – cover art, illustration
 Noel Spirandelli – photography
 Mischa "Big Dho" Burgess – management

Charts

References

External links

2005 albums
9th Wonder albums
Duck Down Music albums
Buckshot (rapper) albums
Albums produced by 9th Wonder